Pedesina is a comune (municipality) in the Province of Sondrio in the Italian region Lombardy, located about  northeast of Milan and about  southwest of Sondrio. Pedesina borders the following municipalities: Bema, Gerola Alta, Premana, Rasura, Rogolo. It is one of the least populated municipalities in Italy, along with Morterone.

Demographic evolution

References

Cities and towns in Lombardy